Ivanhoe Grammar School is an independent, co-educational, Anglican, day school, located in Ivanhoe (Buckley House and The Ridgeway Campus) and Mernda (Plenty Campus), both located in the north-eastern suburbs of Melbourne, Victoria, Australia.

Founded in 1915 as St James' Grammar School for boys, Ivanhoe Grammar is a school of the Anglican Church of Australia, and caters for approximately 2,200 students from the Early Learning Centre to Year 12, across four campuses.

The school is affiliated with the Headmasters' and Headmistresses' Conference, the Association of Heads of Independent Schools of Australia (AHISA), the Junior School Heads Association of Australia (JSHAA), and is a founding member of the Associated Grammar Schools of Victoria (AGSV). The school is a former member of the G20 Schools Group. Ivanhoe Grammar School is also one of only four Round Square schools in the state of Victoria, and has been an International Baccalaureate World School since December 1994.

History
In 1915, St James' Grammar School established in Parish Hall at St James' Church. The School moved to its current site, Ivanhoe House at The Ridgeway and changed its name to Ivanhoe Grammar School in 1920. Locksley House opened in 1924, it is located on far-South of Ridgeway Campus and today it is utilised for teaching English to ESL students, Music and Performing and Fine Art. The Headmasters' residence, now School House Administration Building, was built in 1928. 

The first International students arrived at Ivanhoe Grammar School in 1941. In 1942, the school as occupied by the Armed Forces and the school relocated to Yea and St James' Parish Church. The Memorial Junior School, now Buckley House, opened in 1955. The first Cadet unit formed in 1961. In 1964, the entire senior school moved from Locksley House to Ivanhoe House site, with Locksley becoming the boarding school. In 1967, the re-built Buckley Hall opened. 

In 1977, after 62 years, Ivanhoe cancelled its boarding program and Locksley House became the Middle School for year 7 and 8 students and Sherwood, whose membership was formerly exclusive to boarders, becomes the fourth day house.
In 1978, the Country Centre opened.
In 1985, land was purchased in the Plenty Valley (Mernda).
Ivanhoe Grammar School's Mernda Campus (later renamed the Plenty Campus) opened in 1990.
In 1992, the Mernda Campus became co-educational. 

The International Baccalaureate was made available at The Ridgeway Secondary Campus in 1996.
In 1998, a new school uniform was introduced and the Memorial Junior School was renamed to Buckley House.
In 1999, Buckley House and The Ridgeway Campus went co-educational. 

In 2001, the re-developed V.R.C Brown Centre and F.O. Watts Building open at The Ridgeway Secondary Campus, with a new school library.
also that year, the Sinclaire Trust Enterprise Centre at Plenty Campus opened.
2003 was the first year in which girls are admitted to the year 7 student intake to Ivanhoe/Ridgeway campus.
Ivanhoe Grammar School hosted the 2005 International Round Square conference.
The Creative Arts Centre at Plenty Campus opened in 2005.
In 2007, the New Science Building (T.R Lee Science Building) was opened by the Governor of Victoria.
Also in 2007, Ivanhoe Grammar School established equestrian training center at Mernda Campus.
In 2009, the Innovation Centre opened at Buckley House for Year 5 and 6 students.
In 2010, a new school cafeteria, named "The Ridge", opened.
In 2013, a new Middle Years Centre opened for Year 7 and 8 students.   

2015 marked the Centenary of Ivanhoe Grammar School with celebrations and acknowledgements occurring right throughout the year. 'A Passion to Serve', the history of Ivanhoe Grammar School was launched in February, with the Rev Sydney Buckley's daughter Mary Buckley in attendance to assist with the formalities. Other notable events included a very successful home coming weekend for the School's alumni, Centenary Ball and The Teams of the Centenary Dinner. A highlight of the year was the procession of Year 12 students from St James Church, the original site of Ivanhoe Grammar School, through the streets of Ivanhoe to the current site on The Ridgeway. Students from all year levels lined the streets as the procession was led by 'The Rev Sydney Buckley' and his 14 first day boys and culminated in a whole school assembly on the South Ground, with an address by 'The Rev Sydney Buckley'. A similar ceremony was held at the Plenty Campus involving 'first day students' and 'The Reverend Sydney Buckley' with all the students dressed in period costumes and engaged in various games and activities that reflected the early 1900s. 

In June 2015, Ivanhoe Grammar teacher Graeme Harder pleaded guilty to multiple sex offences against a male between the ages of 10 and 16. Harder had been with the school for at least 30 years. The offences occurred between 1 April 1991 and 22 April 1992, with Harder suspended from the school on 4 March, the day he was charged with the offences.

In 2017, construction of a new car park located under the school oval began and was completed in mid–2018. Following the completion of this project, work began on a new multi-level Sports Centre at Ridgeway Campus, located in the Locksley area of the Ridgeway Campus. This project is expected to be completed in late 2021. 

In May 2020, Ivanhoe narrowly avoided an appearance before the Fair Work Commission following staff layoffs in response to funding difficulties during the COVID-19 pandemic. The Independent Education Union was to argue that a "downturn in work does not justify Victorian school Ivanhoe Grammar's stand-downs of non-teaching staff under the Fair Work Act."

Campuses 

Ivanhoe Grammar School is currently located over four campuses
 Buckley House (formerly The Memorial Junior School), Ivanhoe. Years: Early Learning Centre (Age 3+) to Grade 6.
 The Ridgeway Campus, Ivanhoe. Years: 7–12.
 Plenty Campus (formerly the Mernda Campus), Mernda. Years: Prep–12.
 La Trobe University Campus, Year 9 Students Only

The school also has three former campuses:
Parish Hall at St James' Church (1915–1920),
Yea, Victoria – The school was relocated to Yea during WWII, and
"Charnwood" (later renamed "Strathbogie"), Lima East, Victoria – The school's country centre was opened in 1978.

The Ridgeway Campus
The Ridgeway Campus encompasses Year 7 to 12 and is located in Ivanhoe, a suburb located approximately 12 kilometres north-east of Melbourne's CBD. For students in Year 11 and 12, The Ridgeway Campus offers the state's traditional Victorian Certificate of Education qualification, or the Internationally recognised International Baccalaureate Programme. The Ridgeway Campus is co-educational.

Plenty Campus
The Plenty Campus (formerly the Mernda Campus) was founded in 1990, and is co-educational from Prep to Year 12. It is located in Bridge Inn Rd, Mernda, an outer suburb north of Melbourne. The Plenty Campus offers only the Victorian Certificate of Education to Years 11 and 12, however students at the Plenty Campus can choose to transfer to The Ridgeway Campus to study the International Baccalaureate for their final two years of schooling.

Buckley House 
Also located in Ivanhoe, The Memorial Junior School was opened in 1955, and was built using the donations from the families of old boys who died in the Second World War. It was renamed "Buckley House" in 1998. In memory of the old boys who gave their life for King and Country, there now stands a small stone memorial.

Buckley House is Ivanhoe's primary school, accepting students from ELC 3 to Year 6, and is located on the North side of The Ridgeway Campus.

La Trobe University Campus 
In 2018, Ivanhoe Grammar announced a partnership with La Trobe University in which Year 9 classes would be held in specially renovated heritage terrace houses on the university property. The campus opened for the 2019 school year and provided students with a year long, unique learning experience that incorporated the use of university facilities and input from key university personnel.

Sport 
Ivanhoe Grammar School is a member of the Associated Grammar Schools of Victoria (AGSV).

AGSV & AGSV/APS premierships 
Ivanhoe Grammar School has won the following AGSV & AGSV/APS premierships.

Boys:

 Athletics (20) – 1922, 1923, 1925, 1927, 1933, 1948, 1988, 1989, 1990, 1991, 1992, 1993, 1994, 1997, 1998, 1999, 2000, 2001, 2002, 2003
 Badminton (3) – 1997, 2001, 2013
 Basketball (7) – 1993, 1994, 1995, 2002, 2003, 2005, 2018
 Cricket (10) – 1937, 1950, 1959, 1962, 1997, 1998, 1999, 2001, 2002, 2021
 Cross Country (8) – 1991. 1992, 1993, 1994, 1995, 1996, 1997, 1999
 Football (8) – 1934, 1935, 1936, 1941, 1944, 1957, 1958, 1963
 Golf – 2002
 Hockey (2) – 1992, 1993
 Soccer (5) – 1997, 2003, 2004, 2012, 2014
 Squash (7) – 1995, 1996, 1997, 1998, 1999, 2005, 2006
 Swimming (19) – 1940, 1980, 1988, 1989, 1990, 1991, 1992, 1993, 1994, 1997, 1998, 1999, 2000, 2001, 2002, 2007, 2008, 2009, 2013
 Table Tennis – 2003
 Tennis (8) – 1927, 1929, 1950, 1951, 1962, 1969, 1970, 1985
 Volleyball – 2021

Girls:

 Athletics (4) – 2014, 2016, 2017, 2018
 Netball (3) – 2014, 2015, 2016
 Softball – 2013
 Swimming (6) – 2010, 2011, 2012, 2013, 2019, 2021
 Volleyball (2) – 2018, 2019

Notable alumni

Academic
John Alexander McKenzie, AM – Former Deputy Vice-Chancellor (Research) at The University of Melbourne; professor of Genetics and Personal Chair of the Department of Genetics; Recipient of the Centenary Medal 2003
Stephen Bigelow – Mathematician

Entertainment, Media and the Arts
Wilbur Wilde; saxophonist
Tarik Frimpong; Actor

Medicine and Science
Rev. Irwin Faris – assistant curate of the Surf Coast Parish; foundation professor of surgery at Geelong Hospital and the University of Melbourne (1992–99), former chief of surgery (1997–99); former editor-in-chief of the Australian and New Zealand Journal of Surgery; recipient of the Royal Australasian College of Surgeons Medal 2001

Politics, Armed Services, Public Service and the Law
John Ingles Richardson – former Member of the Legislative Assembly, (Liberal) for Forest Hill; former chairman of the Parliamentary Road Safety Committee; former chairman of the Planning Committee; Former Shadow Minister for Community Services, Housing and Aboriginal Affairs (also attended Kerang High School)
John Kelvin Dawson AM – Former Agent General for Queensland to the United Kingdom and commissioner for Europe in London
Harry Jenkins, Snr AM. Former Speaker of the House of Representatives
Harry Jenkins, Jnr AO. Former Speaker of the House of Representatives
John Brumby AO – Premier of Victoria (2007–10)
Rowan Downing QC  -President of the United Nations Dispute Tribunal, UN-appointed judge, Khmer Rouge War Crimes Tribunal, Cambodia & Justice, 2006–2014 Court of Appeal, Vanuatu

Sport
Ben McKinley; AFL Footballer
Kyle Langford; AFL Footballer
Sam Grimley; AFL Footballer
Dylan Buckley; AFL Footballer
Lachlan Murphy; AFL Footballer
Ben Lennon; AFL Footballer
John Stevens; AFL Footballer
Aaron Lord; AFL Footballer
David O'Halloran; AFL Footballer
Mark Richardson; AFL Footballer
Cameron McConville; Racing car driver
Sam Bramham; OAM;  Paralympic gold medalist
Alf Watson; 1928 and 1936 Olympian
Brad Camp; 1988 Olympian (marathon)
Alice Teague-Neeld; Netballer
Nikolas Cox- AFL player
Patrick Naish

See also
 List of schools in Victoria
 List of high schools in Victoria

References

External links
 Ivanhoe Grammar School website
 Ivanhoe Connect

Anglican secondary schools in Melbourne
Associated Grammar Schools of Victoria
Educational institutions established in 1915
Round Square schools
International Baccalaureate schools in Australia
Member schools of the Headmasters' and Headmistresses' Conference
Junior School Heads Association of Australia Member Schools
1915 establishments in Australia
Buildings and structures in the City of Banyule